The recurve men's competition of the archery events at the 2015 Parapan American Games was held between August 9 and 10 at the Varsity Stadium. The defending Parapan American Games champion was Jose Antonio Baez of Mexico.

Schedule
All times are Central Standard Time (UTC-6).

Results

Ranking Round

Competition rounds

References

Archery at the 2015 Parapan American Games